The Bucharian vole (Microtus bucharicus) is a species of rodent in the family Cricetidae. It is found in  Afghanistan, Tajikistan, Uzbekistan, and Turkmenistan. Its natural habitat is temperate desert.

References

Musser, G. G. and M. D. Carleton. 2005. Superfamily Muroidea. pp. 894–1531 in Mammal Species of the World a Taxonomic and Geographic Reference. D. E. Wilson and D. M. Reeder eds. Johns Hopkins University Press, Baltimore.

Rodents of Asia
Mammals of Afghanistan
Mammals described in 1930
Taxonomy articles created by Polbot

Microtus
Taxobox binomials not recognized by IUCN